The prime minister of Bulgaria is the head of government of Bulgaria. They are the leader of a political coalition in the Bulgarian parliament – known as the National Assembly of Bulgaria (Narodno sabranie) – and the leader of the cabinet. At times, the prime minister has been appointed by the President of Bulgaria.

Galab Donev has been the prime minister of Bulgaria since 2 August 2022.

See also 
 Government of Bulgaria
 History of Bulgaria
 Politics of Bulgaria
 List of Bulgarian monarchs
 List of heads of the state of Bulgaria
 List of presidents of Bulgaria (1990–present)

References

 
1879 establishments in Bulgaria